The 2000 Worthing Borough Council election took place on 4 May 2000 to elect members of Worthing Borough Council in West Sussex, England. One third of the council was up for election and the Conservative Party held overall control of the council.

For the second election in a row, a former mayor defected in the run up to the election. This year Geraldine Lissenburg joined the Liberal Democrats after earlier leaving the Conservatives to sit briefly as an independent.

After the election, the composition of the council was:
Conservative 20
Liberal Democrat 16

Election result

References

2000 English local elections
2000
2000s in West Sussex